Kirané  is a small town and principal settlement of the commune of Kirané Kaniaga in the Cercle of Yélimané in the Kayes Region of south-western Mali.

References

Populated places in Kayes Region